Babsie Steger (born 1968) is an Austrian television actress, dancer, singer and television presenter.

Biography 
Babsie Steger was born in Waidhofen an der Ybbs in Lower Austria. She left her native Austria at age 18 after studying classical dance at the Vienna State Opera, where she worked with Rudolf Nureyev, Mikhail Baryshnikov in the ballets of Maurice Béjart. She arrived in France studying at the École de Danse Princesse Grace in Monaco with prestigious teachers like Mariska Besobrasova. She then came to Paris learning French and Italian while working as a dancer and model. She appeared in fashion shows and advertisements, and took theater classes with John Strasberg at the Actors Studio.

Her first job was a classical dancer and permitted her to know well the human body and the correct way to feed herself. She has always been interested on dietetic and the welfare, and thus for over 20 years. She founded in 2003 a restaurant in Paris, where she tested for the first time her Austrian pastry recipes, which later appeared in 2011 in her book Strudel, Kouglof et Cie.

Career 
A few months after arriving in Paris, she was engaged as a dancer in the television series Palace. She was noticed by Jean-Luc Azoulay who then engaged her to portray the role of Hilguegue in the series Salut les Musclés, which was declining. The series became successful once again and Babsie Steger became very famous. After over a hundred episodes broadcast until 1994, the series were re-titled La Croisière foll'amour and still with the same actors. This spin-off of Salut les Musclés was also successful until 1997 on TF1.

In 1993, she became a singer at AB Groupe with the single "Dance with Me", which permitted her to perform live during the first part of the concert s of Hélène Rollès at the Zénith de Paris and on tour in France in autumn 1993. She later released two singles, "Juste un petit peu d'amour" and "Le Yaya".

She is also known for her minor roles in French television series where she played along with Roger Hanin, Pierre Arditi, Charlotte Gainsbourg, Gérard Depardieu, Bernard Le Coq, Pierre Mondy, Mimie Mathy, Patrick Timsit and many others. She has appeared in series such as Navarro, Le G.R.E.C., Fabien Cosma (2005), L'Été rouge, Joséphine, ange gardien, Nestor Burma (2003), Père et Maire (2003), Le fond de l'air est frais (2004), Le Proc (2004–06), Commissaire Moulin (2005), Avocats et Associés (2005) and Désiré Landru (2005).

In addition to her acting career, Babsie Steger is also a television presenter on the channels IDF1 and Vivolta from 2008 to 2012. She presents from 2012 to 2013 the pastry program Les pâtisseries de Babsie on channels Chérie 25 and Cuisine+.

Filmography

References

External links 

Official website

1968 births
Austrian television actresses
Austrian female dancers
Austrian dancers
Austrian television presenters
People from Waidhofen an der Ybbs
Living people
Austrian women television presenters